John Reynolds may refer to:

Entertainment
 John Reynolds (actor) (born 1991), American actor and writer
 John Reynolds (musician), record producer, the first husband of singer Sinéad O'Connor
 John Reynolds (writer) (1588–1655), English merchant and writer
 John Hamilton Reynolds (1794–1852), English poet, satirist, critic, and playwright
 John Lawrence Reynolds (born 1939), Canadian author
 Jonathan Reynolds (writer) (1942–2021), American actor and writer

Military
 John Reynolds (Roundhead) (1625–1657), soldier in the English Civil War
 John Reynolds (Royal Navy officer) (1713–1788), British naval officer and governor of the Province of Georgia
 John F. Reynolds (1820–1863), American army officer active in the US Civil War

Politics
 John Reynolds (1670–1699), Irish Member of Parliament
 John Reynolds (Canadian politician) (born 1942), Canadian politician from British Columbia
 John Reynolds (Dublin politician) (1797–1868)
 John Reynolds (Illinois politician) (1788–1865), American politician, governor of Illinois
 John Reynolds (Indiana politician) (1814–1890), American politician from Indiana
 John F. Reynolds (politician) (1852–1934), American politician from Wisconsin
 John Hazard Reynolds (1819–1875), American politician from New York
 John Merriman Reynolds (1848–1933), American politician from Pennsylvania
 John W. Reynolds Sr. (1876–1958), American politician from Wisconsin
 John W. Reynolds Jr. (1921–2002), American politician, governor of Wisconsin
 Jonathan Reynolds (born 1980), British politician, Labour Co-operative MP for Stalybridge and Hyde

Science and technology
 John Reynolds (agriculturist) (1703–1779), English farmer and agricultural innovator
 John Reynolds (astronomer) (1874–1949), British astronomer
 John Reynolds (ecologist) (born 1959), Canadian ecologist
 John Reynolds (physicist) (1923–2000), American physicist
 John C. Reynolds (1935–2013), American computer scientist
 John Russell Reynolds (1828–1896), British neurologist

Sports
 John Reynolds (motorcyclist) (born 1963), British motorcycle racer
 John J. Reynolds(1889–1987), American track and field athlete

Other people
 John Reynolds (priest), English Anglican priest
 J.F. Reynolds (John F. Reynolds), American architect
 John Henry Reynolds (educator) (1842–1927), British champion of technical education
 John N. Reynolds, banker
 John W. Reynolds (Oregon attorney) (1875–1942), American attorney and educator

See also
 Reynolds-Morris House, in Philadelphia, Pennsylvania, built in 1786–87 by John and William Reynolds
 Jon A. Reynolds (1937–2022), United States Air Force officer
 Jack Reynolds (disambiguation)
 Gen. John F. Reynolds School, in Philadelphia, Pennsylvania, United States
 John Rainolds or Reynolds (1549–1607), English academic and churchman
 John Reynolds Gardiner (1944–2006), American author and engineer
 John Reynold, MP for Bath, England